Gladys Bokese (born 10 September 1981) is a Congolese footballer who currently plays for Congo Premier League side Léopards.

Starting his career at Kinshasha club AS Bandal he then joined Kinshasa giants Daring Club Motema Pembe with Mbala Mbuta Biscotte and Ngasanya Ilongo, where he would become a mainstay, winning the Linafoot thrice (2004, 2005, 2008) and the Coupe du Congo twice (2009, 2010) and captaining the team before leaving for Etoile sportive du Sahel from where he was quickly released.

He has also appeared regularly for the Congo DR with whom he reached the quarter finals of the 2006 Africa Cup of Nations and won the inaugural 2009 African Nations Championship for locally based internationals but was not called for the 2013 Africa Cup of Nations due to lack of match practice.

Initially a striker, he was converted to center back by manager Claude Le Roy who first selected him to the national team in 2004, he has since then stayed in defence.

International career

International goals
Scores and results list DR Congo's goal tally first.

References

Specific

1981 births
Living people
Footballers from Kinshasa
Democratic Republic of the Congo footballers
Democratic Republic of the Congo international footballers
2006 Africa Cup of Nations players
Association football defenders
Daring Club Motema Pembe players
Étoile Sportive du Sahel players
Democratic Republic of the Congo expatriate footballers
Expatriate footballers in Tunisia
Expatriate footballers in the Republic of the Congo
Democratic Republic of the Congo expatriate sportspeople in the Republic of the Congo
2011 African Nations Championship players
21st-century Democratic Republic of the Congo people
2009 African Nations Championship players
Democratic Republic of the Congo A' international footballers